East Virginia or Eastern Virginia may refer to:
 the Eastern part of Virginia, very roughly comprising the Tidewater (region) of Virginia
 A rarely used term for Virginia to distinguish it from West Virginia
 East Virginia (song), a traditional song first recorded as "East Virginia Blues" by the Carter Family and popular bluegrass standard
 the Eastern Shore of Virginia
 Eastern District of Virginia
 a fictional location in the comic strip Shoe
 a fictional location containing Grantville, which used various names

See also
 Virginia (disambiguation)
 West Virginia (disambiguation)